Indoseges is a genus of south Asian tube dwelling spiders. It was first described by S. R. Choudhury, Manju Siliwal and S. K. Das in 2021, and it has only been found in India.

Species
 it contains five species:
I. chilika Siliwal, Das, Choudhury & Giroti, 2021 – India
I. malkangiri Choudhury, Siliwal, Das & Giroti, 2021 (type) – India
I. narayani Choudhury, Siliwal, Das & Giroti, 2021 – India
I. satkosia Das, Siliwal, Choudhury & Giroti, 2021 – India
I. sushildutta Siliwal, Das, Choudhury,  & Giroti, 2021 – India

See also
 List of Segestriidae species

References

Segestriidae
Araneomorphae genera
Spiders of the Indian subcontinent